Hugh Arthur Stephenson (born 18 July 1938) is a British journalist. He was the business editor of The Times from 1969 to 1981, and the editor of the New Statesman from 1982 to 1986.

Early life
Stephenson was born at Faizabad in the Bengal district of British India, the son of Sir Hugh Stephenson (1906 - 1972), a diplomat who worked for the Indian Civil Service. He attended Winchester College, where he became head boy. He attended New College, Oxford, and served as President of the Oxford Union in 1962.

Career
Stephenson was the business editor for The Times between 1969 and 1981. He was then editor of the New Statesman from 1982 to 1986. He subsequently held a post as professor of journalism at City University in London, from 1986. In 2003, Stephenson retired from the University post, where he served as head of the department of journalism. Stephenson currently serves as crossword editor at The Guardian.

References

The Times journalists
1938 births
People educated at Winchester College
Alumni of New College, Oxford
Presidents of the Oxford Union
New Statesman people
Indian journalists